The sixth season of the German singing competition The Masked Singer premiered on 19 March 2022 on ProSieben. Ruth Moschner and Rea Garvey returned to the panel. Matthias Opdenhövel also returned as host. Thore Schölermann hosted only the first episode after Opdenhövel tested positive for COVID-19.

On 23 April 2022, the Zebra (singer Ella Endlich) was declared the winner and the Dornteufel (actor Mark Keller) was the runner-up.

Panelists and host

TV Presenter Ruth Moschner and singer Rea Garvey both returned for their fifth and fourth season as panelists, respectively. Regular host Matthias Opdenhövel tested positive for COVID-19 a few days before production was set to begin in March 2022; consequently, Thore Schölermann guest hosted the first episode. Opdenhövel returned in the second episode.

As in previous seasons, a spin-off show named The Masked Singer - red. Special was aired after each live episode, hosted by Rebecca Mir (episode 1, 5), Annemarie Carpendale (episode 2, 4, 6) and Viviane Geppert (episode 3).

Guest panelists
Various guest panelists appeared as the third judge in the judging panel for one episode. These guest panelists included:

Contestants
Like in the previous seasons, the sixth season included 10 contestants. Children had until 20 November 2021 to send ProSieben drawings of costumes they would like to see for season 6. One mask from the submissions will appear as a costume in season six. The production chose the drawing of 10-year-old Emma, who had painted the Brilli mask. The most labor-intensive costume was the Dornteufel with 1000 hours of work, the easiest was the Seestern. In the second episode on 26 March 2022, Galax'Sis could not appear because the celebrity in this character was sick with COVID-19.

Episodes

Week 1 (19 March)

Week 2 (26 March)

Week 3 (2 April)

Week 4 (9 April)

Week 5 (16 April)

Week 6 (23 April)
 Group number: "Don't Stop Believin'" by Journey

Round One

Round Two

Round Three

Reception

Ratings

References

External links
 

2022 German television seasons
The Masked Singer (German TV series)